The Gavurbağı massacre happened on July 12, 1946, when the Iraqi police opened fire on Iraqi Turkmen rights protestors in Kirkuk's Gavurbağı park. The protestors all worked for the Kirkuk Oil Company.

Massacre 
Before the massacre, ethnic Turkmen workers were protesting for their rights. On July 7, 1946, the Iraqi Minister of Economy, Baba Ali Sheikh Mahmud, went to the Ministry of Arshad Al-Omari in Kirkuk, pressuring al-Omari to put an end to the protests, one way or another. However, al-Omari could not persuade them to stop protesting, and began using threats and intimidation, which did not work either. Protesting workers responded by gathering in Gavurbağı Park, and then Iraqi police arrived and met them with bullets. 16 workers were killed and 30 injured in the attack.

See also 

 1991 Altun Kupri massacre
 Kirkuk Massacre of 1924

References 

1946 in Iraq
Massacres in 1946
July 1946 events in Asia
Iraqi Turkmens
Massacres in Iraq
Iraqi war crimes
Persecution of Turkish people
History of Kirkuk Governorate